CustomerVision BizWiki was a wiki application, geared to medium- and large-sized businesses, that existed from around 2006 to 2008. It was developed and sold by CustomerVision, a company founded by Cindy Rockwell, Brian Keairns and Cliff Monlux.

CustomerVision BizWiki was reviewed in publications such as Network World, Intranet Journal and Internetnews.com. It was also a finalist for the Intranet Journal Product of the Year award for 2007, and for KMWorld Magazine's 2006 km Promise Awards.

References
 Wikis Change The Meaning Of "Groupthink"(Forrester Research report), January 10, 2007
 Enterprise Wiki Solutions - Tech News Radio Podcast, July 18, 2006
 Jupiter Research report
 BizWiki Offers Collaboration With Controls, Intranet Journal, May 3, 2006
 Review: Wikis In The Enterprise, Network Computing, March 30, 2006

Proprietary wiki software